Dóchas is the network of non-governmental organisations (NGOs) involved in development and relief overseas and development education in Ireland. Formed in 1974, Dóchas is an umbrella group for a diverse range of organisations - large and small, young and old, secular or faith-based – that share their commitment to tackle poverty and inequality in the world. Through Dóchas, Irish NGOs work together on issues that are done better together than alone. Dóchas provides a space for NGOs to come together and exchange their experiences, and to use those experiences to come up with more effective ways to end all forms of poverty and injustice. Dóchas is the Irish member of CONCORD.

Vision 
Dóchas's vision is of a world where poverty and inequality are unacceptable, and where every person has the right to live free from fear, free from want, and able to fulfil their potential.

Purpose 
The purpose of Dóchas is to enhance Ireland's contribution to world development. It achieves this by: leading the Development sector towards high standards of practice and being an independent representative voice of Ireland's Development sector, in order to influence public debate and decision-making in Ireland and the European Union.

Mission 
Dóchas is part of a movement working to build a society, in Ireland and in Europe, that actively seeks to eradicate global poverty, injustice and inequality.

People 
 Helen Keogh, former Chairperson
 Hans Zomer, former Director

References

External links 
 Dóchas website
 Dóchas blog

Non-profit organisations based in the Republic of Ireland
International development organizations